Claude-Frédéric Bastiat (30 June 1801 – 24 December 1850) was a French economist, writer and a prominent member of the French Liberal School.

A member of the French National Assembly, Bastiat developed the economic concept of opportunity cost and introduced the parable of the broken window. He was described as "the most brilliant economic journalist who ever lived" by economic theorist Joseph Schumpeter.

As an advocate of classical economics and the economics of Adam Smith, his views favored a free market and influenced the Austrian School. He is best known for his book The Law where he argued that law must protect rights such as private property, not "plunder" others' property.

Biography 

Bastiat was born on 29 June 1801 in Bayonne, Aquitaine, a port town in the south of France on the Bay of Biscay. His father, Pierre Bastiat, was a prominent businessman in the town. His mother died in 1808 when Frédéric was seven years old. His father moved inland to the town of Mugron, with Frédéric following soon afterward. The Bastiat estate in Mugron had been acquired during the French Revolution and had previously belonged to the Marquis of Poyanne. Pierre Bastiat died in 1810, leaving Frédéric an orphan. He was fostered by his paternal grandfather and his unmarried aunt Justine Bastiat. He attended a school in Bayonne, but his aunt thought poorly of it and so enrolled him in the school Saint-Sever. At age 17, he left school at Sorèze to work for his uncle in his family's export business. It was the same firm where his father had been a partner.

Bastiat began to develop an intellectual interest as he no longer wished to work with his uncle and desired to go to Paris for formal studies. This hope was not realized as his grandfather was in poor health and wished to go to the Mugron estate. Bastiat accompanied him and cared for him. The next year when Bastiat was 24, his grandfather died, leaving him the family estate, thereby providing him with the means to further his theoretical inquiries. Bastiat developed intellectual interests in several areas including philosophy, history, politics, religion, travel, poetry, political economy and biography. After the middle-class Revolution of 1830, Bastiat became politically active and was elected justice of the peace of Mugron in 1831 and to the Council General (county-level assembly) of Landes in 1832. Bastiat was elected to the national legislative assembly after the French Revolution of 1848.

His public career as an economist began only in 1844, when his first article was published in the Journal des économistes during October of that year and it was ended by his untimely death in 1850. Bastiat contracted tuberculosis, probably during his tours throughout France to promote his ideas and that illness eventually prevented him from making further speeches (particularly at the legislative assembly to which he was elected in 1848 and 1849) and ended his life. In The Law, he wrote: "Until the day of my death, I shall proclaim this principle with all the force of my lungs (which alas! is all too inadequate)".

This last line is understood by translators to be a reference to the effects of his tuberculosis. During the autumn of 1850, he was sent to Italy by his doctors and he first traveled to Pisa, then to Rome. On 24 December 1850, Bastiat called those with him to approach his bed and murmured twice the words "the truth" before he died at the age of 49.

Works 

Bastiat was the author of many works on economics and political economy, generally characterized by their clear organization, forceful argumentation and acerbic wit. Economist Murray Rothbard wrote that "Bastiat was indeed a lucid and superb writer, whose brilliant and witty essays and fables to this day are remarkable and devastating demolitions of protectionism and of all forms of government subsidy and control. He was a truly scintillating advocate of an unrestricted free market". However, Bastiat himself declared that subsidy should be available, albeit limited under extraordinary circumstances, saying the following: "Under extraordinary circumstances, for urgent cases, the State should set aside some resources to assist certain unfortunate people, to help them adjust to changing conditions".

Among his better known works is Economic Sophisms, a series of essays (originally published in the Journal des économistes) which contain a defence of free trade. Bastiat wrote the work while living in England to advise the shapers of the French Republic on perils to avoid. Economic Sophisms was translated and adapted for an American readership in 1867 by the economist and historian of money Alexander del Mar, writing under the pseudonym Emile Walter.

Economic Sophisms and the candlemakers' petition 
Contained within Economic Sophisms is the satirical parable known as the candlemakers' petition in which candlemakers and tallow producers lobby the Chamber of Deputies of the French July Monarchy (1830–1848) to block out the Sun to prevent its unfair competition with their products. Also included in the Sophisms is a facetious petition to the king asking for a law forbidding the usage of everyone's right hand, based on a presumption by some of his contemporaries that more difficulty means more work and more work means more wealth.

The Law (1850) 
Bastiat's most famous work is The Law, originally published as a pamphlet in 1850. It defines a just system of laws and then demonstrates how such law facilitates a free society. In The Law, Bastiat wrote that everyone has a right to protect "his person, his liberty, and his property". The state should be only a "substitution of a common force for individual forces" to defend this right. According to Bastiat, justice (meaning defense of one's life, liberty and property) has precise limits, but if government power extends further into philanthropic endeavors, then government becomes so limitless that it can grow endlessly. The resulting statism is "based on this triple hypothesis: the total inertness of mankind, the omnipotence of the law, and the infallibility of the legislator". The public then becomes socially engineered by the legislator and must bend to the legislators' will "like the clay to the potter", saying: Socialism, like the ancient ideas from which it springs, confuses the distinction between government and society. As a result of this, every time we object to a thing being done by government, the socialists conclude that we object to its being done at all. We disapprove of state education. Then the socialists say that we are opposed to any education. We object to a state religion. Then the socialists say that we want no religion at all. We object to a state-enforced equality. Then they say that we are against equality. And so on, and so on. It is as if the socialists were to accuse us of not wanting persons to eat because we do not want the state to raise grain.

 In his short essay, The Law, published in 1850, he presents simply and elegantly some of the most important concepts of classical liberal thinking. His work is considered a very valuable resource and has served as an important inspiration to many similarly inclined authors.
I do not dispute their right to invent social combinations, to advertise them, to advocate them, and to try them upon themselves, at their own expense and risk. But I do dispute their right to impose these plans upon us by law – by force – and to compel us to pay for them with our taxes.

Bastiat posits that the law becomes perverted when it punishes one's right to self-defense (of his life, liberty and property) in favor of another's right to legalized plunder which he defines as "if the law takes from some persons what belongs to them, and gives it to other persons to whom it does not belong. See if the law benefits one citizen at the expense of another by doing what the citizen himself cannot do without committing a crime" in which he includes the tax support of "protective tariffs, subsidies, guaranteed profits, guaranteed jobs, relief and welfare schemes, public education, progressive taxation, free credit, and public works". According to Bastiat, legal plunder can be committed in "an infinite number of ways. Thus we have an infinite number of plans for organizing it: tariffs, protection, benefits, subsidies, encouragements, progressive taxation, public schools, guaranteed jobs, guaranteed profits, minimum wages, a right to relief, a right to the tools of labor, free credit, and so on, and so on. All these plans as a whole — with their common aim of legal plunder — constitute socialism". Bastiat also made the following humorous point: "If the natural tendencies of mankind are so bad that it is not safe to permit people to be free, how is it that the tendencies of these organizers are always good? Do not the legislators and their appointed agents also belong to the human race? Or do they believe that they themselves are made of a finer clay than the rest of mankind?"

"What is Seen and What is Not Seen" 
In his 1850 essay "Ce qu'on voit et ce qu'on ne voit pas" ("What is seen and what is not seen"), Bastiat introduced through the parable of the broken window the concept of opportunity cost in all but name. This term was not coined until over sixty years after his death by Friedrich von Wieser in 1914.

Debate with Pierre-Joseph Proudhon 
Bastiat also famously engaged in a debate between 1849 and 1850 with Pierre-Joseph Proudhon about the legitimacy of interest. As Robert Leroux argued, Bastiat had the conviction that Proudhon's anti-interest doctrine "was the complete antithesis of any serious approach". Proudhon famously lost his temper and resorted to ad hominem attacks: "Your intelligence is asleep, or rather it has never been awake. You are a man for whom logic does not exist. You do not hear anything, you do not understand anything. You are without philosophy, without science, without humanity. Your ability to reason, like your ability to pay attention and make comparisons is zero. Scientifically, Mr. Bastiat, you are a dead man".

Views 
Bastiat asserted that the sole purpose of government is to protect the right of an individual to life, liberty and property and that it is dangerous and morally wrong for government to interfere with an individual's other personal matters. From this, Bastiat concluded that the law cannot defend life, liberty and property if it promotes legal or legalized plunder which he defined as using government force and laws to take something from one individual and give it to others (as opposed to a transfer of property via mutually-agreed contracts without using fraud or violent threats against the other party, which Bastiat considered a legitimate transfer of property).

In The Law, Bastiat explains that if the privileged classes or socialists use the government for legalized plunder, this will encourage the other socioeconomic class to also use legal plunder and that the correct response to the socialists is to cease all legal plunder. Bastiat also explains in The Law why his opinion is that the law cannot defend life, liberty and property if it promotes socialist policies. When used to obtain legalized plunder for any group, he says that the law is perverted against the only things (life, liberty and property) it is supposed to defend.

Bastiat was a strong supporter of free trade who was inspired by and routinely corresponded with Richard Cobden and the English Anti-Corn Law League and worked with free-trade associations in France.

Because of his stress on the role of consumer demand in initiating economic progress (a form of demand-side economics), Bastiat has been described by Mark Thornton, Thomas DiLorenzo and other economists as a forerunner of the Austrian School, with Thornton positing that through taking this position on the motivations of human action he demonstrates a pronounced "Austrian flavor". In his Economic Harmonies, Bastiat states: 

One of Bastiat's most important contributions to economics was his admonition that good economic decisions can be made only by taking into account the "full picture". That is, economic truths should be arrived at by observing not only the immediate consequences—that is, benefits or liabilities—of an economic decision, but also by examining the long-term second and third consequences. Additionally, one must examine the decision's effect not only on a single group of people (say candlemakers) or a single industry (say candlemaking), but on all people and all industries in the society as a whole. As Bastiat famously put it, an economist must take into account both "What is Seen and What is Not Seen". Bastiat's "rule" was later expounded and developed by Henry Hazlitt in his work Economics in One Lesson in which Hazlitt borrowed Bastiat's trenchant broken window fallacy and went on to demonstrate how it applies to a wide variety of economic falsehoods.

Negative railroad 
A famous section of Economic Sophisms concerns the way that tariffs and customs are inherently counterproductive. Bastiat posits a theoretical railway between Spain and France that is built to reduce the costs of trade between the two countries. This is achieved by making goods move to and from the two nations faster and more easily. Bastiat demonstrates that this situation benefits both countries' consumers, because it reduces the cost of shipping goods and, therefore, reduces the price at market for those goods. However, each country's producers begin to criticize their governments, because the other country's producers can now provide certain goods to the domestic market at reduced price. Domestic producers of these goods are afraid of being outcompeted by the newly viable industry from the other country; therefore these domestic producers demand that tariffs be enacted to artificially raise the cost of the foreign goods back to their pre-railroad levels so that they can continue to compete. Thus, Bastiat makes two significant statements here:
 Even if the producers in a society are benefited by these tariffs (which they are not, according to Bastiat), the consumers in that society are clearly hurt by the tariffs as they are now unable to secure the goods they want at the low price at which they should be able to secure them.
 The tariffs completely negate any gains made by the railroad and therefore make it essentially pointless.

To further demonstrate his statements, Bastiat suggests—in a classic reductio ad absurdum—that rather than enacting tariffs, the government should simply destroy the railroad anywhere that foreign goods can outcompete local goods. Since this would be just about everywhere, he goes on to suggest that this government should simply build a broken or "negative" railroad right from the start and not waste time with tariffs and rail building.

Bastiat's tomb 

Bastiat died in Rome and is buried at San Luigi dei Francesi in the center of that city. He declared on his deathbed that his friend Gustave de Molinari (publisher of Bastiat's 1850 book The Law) was his spiritual heir.

Books

See also 

 Age of Enlightenment
 Anne Robert Jacques Turgot, Baron de Laune
 Bastiat Prize
 Harmonies of Political Economy
 Hippolyte Castille
 List of liberal theorists
 Physiocrats

References

Further reading 
 Bastiat's Legacy in Economics by Jorg Guido Hulsmann
 Frédéric Bastiat's Views on the Nature of Money by Mark Thornton
 Frédéric Bastiat: Two Hundred Years On by Joseph R. Stromberg
 Foville, A. de. "Bastiat" (1900). In Nouveau dictionnaire de l’économie politique. Deuxième édition. Tome premier. A–H. Publié sous la direction de M. Léon Say et de M. Joseph Chailley, 170–172. Paris: Guillaumin et Cie .

External links 

 
 
 
 Bastiat.org publishes and indexes information about Bastiat
 Cercle Frédéric Bastiat publishes and indexes information about Bastiat
 The Bastiat Society
 "Frédéric Bastiat: Libertarian Challenger or Political Bargainer?" article by economist Brian Baugus on the development of Bastiat's thinking
 The Bastiat Collection Volume 1, The Bastiat Collection Volume 2 – A collection of Bastiat works published by the Ludwig von Mises Institute

 Audio version of Russell's translation of The Law
  The Law – Frederic Bastiat (PDF English)
 

1801 births
1850 deaths
19th-century deaths from tuberculosis
19th-century French economists
19th-century French male writers
Classical economists
French classical liberals
French Liberal School
French political writers
French Roman Catholics
Tuberculosis deaths in Italy
Members of the 1848 Constituent Assembly
Members of the National Legislative Assembly of the French Second Republic
Moderate Republicans (France)
People from Bayonne
Politicians from Nouvelle-Aquitaine
French male non-fiction writers
Infectious disease deaths in Lazio